John Pinckney Bethell, Sr. (July 4, 1907 – January 2, 1981) was an American politician. He was a member of the Arkansas House of Representatives, serving from 1949 to 1972. He was a member of the Democratic party.

References

1981 deaths
1907 births
People from Columbia, Tennessee
20th-century American politicians
Speakers of the Arkansas House of Representatives
Democratic Party members of the Arkansas House of Representatives